The Japan Keirin Autorace Foundation, or , is the regulating body for pari-mutuel keirin cycle racing and Auto Race motorcycle racing competitions in Japan. These sports—two of Japan's four authorized  where gambling is permitted—were originally regulated by two separate organizations. These sports and organizations were brought under the authority of the JKA on April 1, 2008.

Keirin
Today the present JKA is responsible for fostering Japan's bicycle industry and regulating keirin racing in Japan.

In addition to licensing keirin racers, the association sets specifications for frames and parts such as wheel size, spoke count, frame geometry, and even weight and material of components. These requirements were established in 1957 in an attempt to prevent any racers from having equipment-related advantages.

Because the foundation's main objective is supporting the Japanese cycling market, its bureaucracy is notoriously critical of foreign manufacturers attempting to enter the Japanese market. The Italian cycling equipment manufacturer Campagnolo has, though, received keirin racing certification.

A common misconception regarding certification is that it is a mark of quality, when in fact it is simply a mark of standardization; parts stamped with the NJS logo have become fashionable in recent years with some Western cyclists.

Auto race
Japan's auto race industry was overseen by the  prior to the founding of the JKA.

Notes

External links
 JKA official website
 Keirin official website
 Autorace website

Cycle racing in Japan
Cycle racing organizations
Motorsport in Japan
Sports governing bodies in Japan